Lars Peter Feld (born August 9, 1966 in Saarbrücken) is a German economist who currently serves as director of the Walter Eucken Institut and as Professor for Economic Policy at the University of Freiburg. From 2020 to 2021 he also chaired the German Council of Economic Experts. Federal Minister of Finance Christian Lindner made Feld his personal economic policy advisor in February 2022.

Early life and education
Feld studied economics at Saarland University. He obtained his doctorate and habilitation in economics in 1999 and 2002, respectively, both from the University of St. Gallen.

Career
From 2002 until 2005 Feld was visiting academic in economics at the University of Rennes 1. At the same time, from 2002 until 2006, he served as professor for economics and finance at the University of Marburg and, since 2002, he also serves as associate professor for Economics at the University of St. Gallen.

Since 2008 Feld has been a member of the Kronberger Kreis of the Stiftung Marktwirtschaft and in this context calls for more private liability within the European bank union.

From 2006 until 2010 Feld held the chair for finance at the University of Heidelberg. At the same time he was offered a research professorship at the Centre for European Economic Research (ZEW) in Mannheim which he took on in 2006. In addition to this, since 2007, he is visiting academic at the Centre for European Economic Research (ZEW) in Mannheim. During this time he worked as curator for student business consulting GalileiConsult e.V. in Heidelberg.

Since September 2010 Feld has been professor for economic policy at the University of Freiburg and serves as lead executive at the Walter Eucken Institute.

From 2011 to 2021, Feld served as a member of the German Council of Economic Experts; in 2020, he became the body's chairman. He left the position in 2021 after he was not reappointed to a third term by Federal Minister of Finance Olaf Scholz.

Since 2013, Feld has also been serving on the advisory board of the Stability Council, a body devised as part of Germany’s national implementation of the European Fiscal Compact.

In 2022, Feld declined an offer to lead the Institute for Advanced Studies (IHS).

Selected publications

Other activities
 Grüner Wirtschaftsdialog, Member of the Advisory Board (since 2021)
 Econwatch, Member of the Board of Trustees (since 2012)
 RWI Essen, Member of the Scientific Advisory Board (since 2011)
 German Institute for Economic Research (DIW), Member of the Scientific Advisory Board (since 2010)
 Academy of Sciences Leopoldina, Member (since 2008)
 Kronberger Kreis, Stiftung Marktwirtschaft, Member (since 2008)
 Mehr Demokratie, Member of the Board of Trustees
 VDMA Impuls-Stiftung, Member of the Board of Trustees
 Herbert Giersch Stiftung, Member of the Advisory Board
 Ludwig Erhard Foundation, Member
 Wirtschaftsrat der CDU, Member of the Scientific Advisory Board
 Mont Pelerin Society, Member
 Wilhelm Röpke Institute, Member
 German Council on Foreign Relations (DGAP), Member of the Steering Committee (-2016)
 European Public Choice Society (EPCS), President (2007-2009)

Personal life
Feld is married and has three sons.

References

External links 

 

1966 births
Living people
German economists
Saarland University alumni
University of St. Gallen alumni
Member of the Mont Pelerin Society